Kendal Friends Meeting House is a Friends meeting house of the Religious Society of Friends (Quakers) in Kendal, Cumbria, in north-western England.

There have been Quakers in Kendal since the 17th century when the town was visited by George Fox. The present meeting house was purpose-built in 1816 to replace the previous building used by local Quakers. Attendance at Sunday worship in 1816 numbered several hundred.

Architecture
The limestone building was designed by local architect Francis Webster.

In the 1930s Stramongate School, a Quaker institution opposite the meeting house, closed. The building had housed Sunday school classes and it was decided to  move them to the Meeting House, where Webster's Georgian design was modified to provide classroom accommodation on the 1st floor.

Quaker Tapestry

The building is the home of the Quaker Tapestry illustrating the history of Quakerism from the 17th century to the present day.
Like the Bayeux Tapestry, the panels are embroidered rather than being tapestry in the strict sense of the word.

The tapestry opened in 1994 as a visitor attraction. It received a "Hidden Gem" award for 2020-21 from VisitEngland.

Conservation
The meeting house has been designated a Grade II* listed building.

References

Kendal
Kendal
Grade II* listed buildings in Kendal
Grade II* listed religious buildings and structures